Muraszemenye is a village in Zala County, Hungary.

References

External links 
 Street map 

Populated places in Zala County